Anadia pulchella, Ruthven's anadia, is a species of lizard in the family Gymnophthalmidae. It is endemic to Colombia.

References

Anadia (genus)
Reptiles described in 1926
Taxa named by Alexander Grant Ruthven